Yamaleela is a 1994 Indian Telugu-language fantasy comedy film written and directed by S. V. Krishna Reddy, featuring comedian Ali in his first lead role. This film was a huge box office success. It was later remade in Hindi as Taqdeerwala (1995) and in Tamil as Lucky Man (1995).

A spiritual successor titled Yamaleela 2 was released on November 2014. A sequel television series Yamaleela Aa Taruvatha premiered in 2020.

Plot 

Suraj is a mischievous man and his mother is disappointed with his behaviour. Suraj discovers his mother's past, his father is a Zamindar and owner of a palace called Swarna Palace, who died because of debts and they lost their entire property. Suraj swears on his mother to again buy their palace in any circumstances and make his mother happy. Lilly is a petty thief, a very greedy woman and Suraj falls in love with her at first sight, but she turns him down. Thota Ramudu, a rowdy opponent to Lilly, teases Suraj a lot and he falls sick.

Meanwhile, in hell, Yama, the god of death and Chitragupta misplace a book called Bhavishyavaani, which shows the future of man. The book somehow falls on the roof of Suraj's house, he benefits a lot by reading predictions of the future in the book and becomes rich and Thota Ramudu is surprised how Suraj became rich in a short time. Lord Brahma warns Yama and Chitragupta that within one month they should find the book, otherwise they lose their supernatural powers. On earth, Suraj again buys their palace and takes her mother to it and he asks her mother if she wants anything else. She asks him to get married, so Suraj again opens the book to see whether his marriage will happen with Lilly or not. He then reads that his mother will die that night at 10 PM. To fulfill his mother's last wish, Suraj plays a marriage drama with Lilly, but accidentally his mother does not die and Lilly reveals all this drama which leads to his mother's anger and she stops talking to him until he really brings back Lilly as her daughter-in-law.

Meanwhile, Yama and Chitragupta reach earth in search of the book. As they reach earth, they face many problems as everyone thinks of them as some drama company artists. Suraj saves them once and realises that they are the real Yama and Chitragupta and his mother didn't die because they do not have the book. To protect his mother, Suraj traps Yama with the help of a girl Lata. After some time, Yama learns the truth and also understands that the book is with Suraj. Yama asks him to give back the book, but he refuses. From that day, they try for the book in many ways, but fail. One day Thota Ramudu beats Suraj very badly for the secret behind his success, but he doesn't reveal it. Yama saves him and asks him why all this, he says for his mother's sake, then Yama understands his devotion towards her. Yamraj wants to meet her, Suraj invites them to his house without knowing their real faces and accidentally Yama blesses Suraj's mother for complete life.

Meanwhile, Thota Ramudu wants learn the secret behind Suraj's success, and he asks Lilly to go and find out the secret. Lilly plays a love drama with Suraj and asks him the secret, he refuses to reveal it, she finally says he has to make a choice of her or his mother, then without any hesitation he chooses his mother and throws her out, then she understands his affection towards his mother and his love towards her. Finally, Thota Ramudu kidnaps Suraj's mother and blackmails him for the book. Yama takes advantage of the situation and Suraj gives the book to Thota Ramudu. Yama destroys him and collects the book. Finally, Yama comes to take Suraj mother's life, but she has complete life because of his blessings.

Cast 

Ali as Suraj
Indraja as Lily
Kaikala Satyanarayana as Yama
Manju Bhargavi as Ali's mother
Bramhanandam as Chitragupta
Tanikella Bharani as Thota Ramudu
M. Balaiah as Brahma
Kota Srinivasa Rao as Inspector Ranjith
A. V. S.
Gundu Hanumantha Rao as Gundu
Saakshi Ranga Rao as Rangayya
Subbaraya Sharma
Chittibabu
Jenny as Editor
Krishna (Special Appearance in Jumbare Joojumbare Song)
Baby Likhita
Chakradhara Rao
Dham
Kishore Raati (cameo)
Lathasri
Master Milan
Pooja

Soundtrack

Sequels 
A spiritual successor Yamaleela 2 was released in 2014 by the same director. A TV serial Yamaleela Aa Taruvatha has been airing in ETV since 2020 which is a continuation of the events of the 1995 film with Ali and Manju Bhargavi reprising their roles as Suraj and his mother respectively with Suman playing the role of Yama.

Awards 
Nandi Award for Best Choreographer – Suchitra

References

External links 
 

1990s fantasy comedy films
1990s Telugu-language films
1994 films
Films directed by S. V. Krishna Reddy
Films scored by S. V. Krishna Reddy
Films set in Hyderabad, India
Indian fantasy comedy films
Indian religious comedy films
Telugu films remade in other languages
Yama in popular culture